Lui Lok  (born Lui Mo Lok; 16 May 1920 – 13 May 2010) dubbed as 'The Five-Hundred-Million-Dollar Inspector', was a former Hong Kong Detective Staff Sergeant I. He became notorious for his acts of corruption during the 1960s to 1970s during British Hong Kong period, and being wanted by ICAC.

Biography 
Lui Mo Lok was born in Haifeng County, Guangdong and spent his childhood there. Lui immigrated to Cheung Chau before moving to Hong Kong, there he survived as a shoeshiner, a postman and a rickshaw driver before joining the Hong Kong Police Force.

On 9 November 1940, Lui became a police officer in the Patrol Sub Unit of the Hong Kong Police Force. He was then promoted to a detective. While working in the Criminal Investigation Department, he was promoted by Senior Detective Chan Lap, and then CPL, Police Corporal by 1951. That same year, he was transferred to Sham Shui Po Police Station.

In 1955, the gang 14K was one of the four biggest triads in Hong Kong. While 14K was holding a feast in a school located in Diamond Hill, Lui arrested them with his team. Lui was made famous for wiping out the triad with confessions obtained through torture, forced disappearances and extrajudicial executions. As a result, he was promoted to SCPL, Senior Corporal in 1956.

In 1956, the Hong Kong 1956 riots happened. Because of Lui's experience in dealing with the triads, he was arranged in an important position by the administration of the police force. Because of his outstanding work, he was promoted to be the DS/SGT II in New Territories District, stationed in Tsuen Wan Police Station.

In 1958, Lui was transferred to Yau Ma Tei to replace the retired DS/SGT II Lau Fuk. In 1962, the Hong Kong Police Force reset the position of DS/SGT I, and Lui was promoted one of two DS/SGT I positions, Nam Gong was promoted to the other. Lui stationed in Hong Kong Island while Nam was stationed in Kowloon and New Territories.

On 1 April 1962, Lui was awarded the Colonial Police Medal by Queen Elizabeth II on Queen’s Birthday at Hong Kong’s Government House. In 1963, Lui was appointed by Hong Kong Governor Sir Robert Black to a blue ribbon commission to study police reform. 

In 1967, Lui and Nam were transferred to other stations by the Police Force in a case of serious corruption. In 1968, Lui took early retirement from the police force.

In 1973, Lui immigrated to Canada with his wife Choi Chun (蔡珍) and eight children. In 1974, the ICAC was founded, and a wanted notice for Lui was issued in 1976, by then he was settled in Taiwan. He was charged with having assets "disproportionate to and unable to be explained or accounted for by his official emoluments, awards, or allowance'" and many of his assets were frozen by the ICAC. The Hong Kong court recovered part of his assets in 1977, and some of which were later recovered through his estate in 1986. He was unable to be extradited due to the lack of an extradition treaty with Taiwan and legal complications with Hong Kong's treaty with Canada.

In 1979, Lui purchased a luxury apartment in Taipei, Taiwan, where he would reside in low profile for more than 30 years. His daughter became a Taiwanese citizen and was a civil servant, while his seven sons resided in Canada. He died due to gastric cancer on 13 May 2010 in Vancouver, British Columbia, Canada. His funeral was attended by 80 family members and friends at Forest Lawn Memorial Park in Burnaby, where he was buried.

Honours

 Recipient of the Colonial Police Medal (CPM) (1962)

Depictions in media 

Lui has been depicted in various films and TV Series due to his notoriety.

 To Be Number One (1991), Character Tiger Lui, portrayed by Kenneth Tsang.
 Legend of the Brothers (1991), Character Lui Kwok Tin, portrayed by Kenneth Tsang.
 Lee Rock (1991), Character Lee Rock, portrayed by Andy Lau.
 Lee Rock II (1991), Character Lee Rock, portrayed by Andy Lau.
 Arrest the Restless (1992), Character Tiger Lui, portrayed by Andy Lau.
 The Prince of Temple Street (1992), Character Lee Rock, portrayed by Andy Lau.
 Powerful Four (1992), Character Lui Kit, portrayed by Simon Yam.
 The Greed of Man (1992), Character Lung Sing-Bond, portrayed by Kenneth Tsang.
 He Ain't Heavy, He's My Father (1993), Character Sgt Rocky, portrayed by Andrew Kam.
 Old Time Buddy: To Catch a Thief (1998), Character Lui King, portrayed by Felix Lok.
 The H.K. Triad (1999), Character Lok, portrayed by Francis Ng.
 I Corrupt All Cops (2009), Character Lak Chui, portrayed by Tony Leung Ka-Fai.
 Chasing the Dragon (2017), Character Lee Rock, portrayed by Andy Lau.
 The One Billion Dollar Inspector (2020), Character Xu Le, portrayed by Vincent Wong.
 Once Upon a Time in Hong Kong (2021), Character Chui Lok, portrayed by Francis Ng.
 Extras for Chasing The Dragon (2023), Character Xu Le, portrayed by Vincent Wong.
 Where the Wind Blows (2023), portrayed by Aaron Kwok and Chui Tien-you.

References 

1920 births
2010 deaths
Hong Kong police officers
People from Haifeng County
Corruption in Hong Kong
Recipients of the Colonial Police Medal
Deaths from stomach cancer
Deaths from cancer in British Columbia
Chinese emigrants to British Hong Kong